Meng Lang (born March 6, 1984, in Heilongjiang) is a female Chinese racing cyclist, who  competed for Team China at the 2008 Summer Olympics.

Sports career
1998 Heilongjiang Provincial Cycling and Fencing Training Center;
1998 Heilongjiang Provincial Cycling Team;
2006 National Team for Intensified Training

Major performances
2003/2004 Road National Championships - 1st/2nd individual;
2007 Road Asian Championships - 1st individual;
2007 Toulouse Days Race - 1st individual road (Stage 10)

References
 Profile Beijing 2008 Team China

1984 births
Living people
Chinese female cyclists
Cyclists at the 2008 Summer Olympics
Olympic cyclists of China
Cyclists from Heilongjiang
Cyclists at the 2006 Asian Games
Asian Games competitors for China
21st-century Chinese women